5-APB (abbreviation of "5-(2-aminopropyl)benzofuran"; see infobox for the correct IUPAC name) is an empathogenic psychoactive compound of the substituted benzofuran, substituted amphetamine and substituted phenethylamine classes. 5-APB and other compounds are sometimes informally called "Benzofury".

5-APB is commonly found as the succinate and hydrochloride salt. The hydrochloride salt is 10% more potent by mass and doses should be adjusted accordingly.

5-APB has been sold as a designer drug since 2010.

Pharmacology
5-APB is a serotonin–norepinephrine–dopamine reuptake inhibitor with Ki(NET)=180 nmol/L, Ki(DAT)=265 nmol/L and Ki(SERT)=811 nmol/L. It is also a serotonin–norepinephrine–dopamine releasing agent. 5-APB is a potent agonist for the 5-HT2A and 5-HT2B receptors (Ki of 14 nmol/L at 5-HT2B with an efficacy of 0.924). This agonism for 5-HT2B makes it likely that 5-APB would be cardiotoxic with long term use, as seen in other 5-HT2B agonists such as fenfluramine and MDMA.  5-APB is also an agonist of the 5-HT2C receptor.

Detection
A forensic standard of 5-APB is available, and the compound has been posted on the Forendex website of potential drugs of abuse. The US Department of Justice and DEA have also conducted studies concerning the detection of 5-APB.

Effects
Users describe effects as euphoric. Largely, effects reported were similar to that of the drug MDMA but not as strong.  Recreational use of 5-APB has been associated with death in combination with other drugs and solely as the result of 5-APB.

Legality
On March 5, 2014 the UK Home Office announced that 5-APB would be made a class B drug on 10 June 2014 alongside every other benzofuran entactogen and many structurally related drugs.

References 

Substituted amphetamines
5-Benzofuranethanamines
Designer drugs
Serotonin-norepinephrine-dopamine releasing agents
Serotonin receptor agonists
Entactogens and empathogens